Marijan Bilić is a Croatian former footballer who played in the Yugoslav First League, National Soccer League, and North American Soccer League.

Playing career 
Bilić played in the Yugoslav First League with Dinamo Zagreb in 1967. In 1969, he played with Toronto Croatia in the National Soccer League, where he was given the captaincy. He assisted in winning the NSL Championship in 1971, and 1974. In 1977, Toronto Metro's signed Bilić to a playing contract.

Managerial career 
In July 1970, he was named the player-coach for Toronto Croatia. In 1975, he briefly served as an interim coach for the Toronto Metros-Croatia in the North American Soccer League, where he managed a 13-9 record. After the dismissal of Ivan Markovic as head coach in 1976 he returned to the coaching position, where he appointed Domagoj Kapetanović as his tactician and eventual successor.

References 

Year of birth missing
Association football defenders
Yugoslav footballers
GNK Dinamo Zagreb players
Toronto Croatia players
Toronto Blizzard (1971–1984) players
Yugoslav First League players
Canadian National Soccer League players
North American Soccer League (1968–1984) players
Croatian football managers
Toronto Croatia managers 
Toronto Blizzard managers
Canadian National Soccer League coaches
North American Soccer League (1968–1984) coaches
Yugoslav expatriate footballers
Expatriate soccer players in Canada
Yugoslav expatriate sportspeople in Canada